Albert B. "General" McClellan (1898 or 1899 – August 23, 1962) was a college basketball coach at Providence, St. Anselm, Boston College, and Belmont Abbey.

Early life
McClellan was a standout athlete at St. John's Preparatory School and  Mount Saint Joseph College. He pitched in the minor leagues for the Baltimore Orioles of the International League in 1917 and the Waterbury Nattatucks and Hartford Senators of the Eastern League in 1919.

Coaching career
McClellan began his coaching career in 1922 at Salem High School in Salem, Massachusetts. In 1925 he moved to St. John's Preparatory School in Danvers, Massachusetts, where he compiled a 31-2 record over two years.

McClellan was the head coach at Providence from 1927 to 1938. In his eleven seasons as head coach, the Friars had a 147-65 record. He produced two All-Americans, Ed Wineapple (who also played for McClellan at Salem High) and John Krieger. He resigned after the 1938 season because he refused to take a pay cut as part of the administration's decision to give more money to the football team at the expense of the basketball program.

McClellan returned to college basketball in 1940 as the head coach of the St. Anselm Hawks. When Boston College decided to reinstate their basketball team in 1945, McClellan was chosen to coach the revived team. He resigned from his position after the 1953 and became the first head basketball coach at Belmont Abbey College. At the time of his resignation, he was BC's winningest basketball coach. McClellan retired from coaching in 1956.

McClellan died on August 23, 1962, at the age of 63.

References

Year of birth missing
1890s births
1962 deaths
American men's basketball coaches
Basketball coaches from Massachusetts
Belmont Abbey Crusaders men's basketball coaches
Boston College Eagles men's basketball coaches
High school basketball coaches in Massachusetts
Providence Friars men's basketball coaches
Saint Anselm Hawks men's basketball coaches
Sportspeople from Salem, Massachusetts
College men's basketball head coaches in the United States